Masjid Haji Muhammad Salleh & Makam Habib Noh (Jawi: مسجد حاج محمد صالح دان مقام حبيب نوه; Malay for Haji Muhammad Salleh Mosque & Maqam of Habib Noh) is a mosque and Muslim mausoleum respectively in Singapore located at top of Mount Palmer. Today the mausoleum and its adjacent mosque are under the purview of Majlis Ugama Islam Singapura. The mosque is not to be confused for another mosque with a similar name along Geylang Road.

History 
The makam sat on top of Mount Palmer, but following an 1890 refurbishment by Syed Mohamed bin Ahmed bin Abdul Rahman Alsagoff (Nong Chik), it was rebuilt with 52 stairs.

A merchant from Betawi (now Jakarta) and a good friend of Habib Nuh, Haji Muhammad Salleh had built a surau for Habib Nuh before the 1860s. The surau known as Surau Kampong Sambau, was demolished and replaced with the present-day Masjid Haji Muhammad Salleh in 1903.

In July 2017, the mosque and mausoleum have been upgraded with better facilities and greater accessibility to the hilltop shrine. Key architectural features are still preserved.

Folklore 

After Habib Noh died in 1866, folklore tells of how on his body's journey to Telok Blangah Muslim Cemetery, the pallbearers could no longer bear the weight of the coffin. When the mourners remembered Habib Nuh had wanted to be interred on Mount Palmer, they could once more lift the coffin.

After Habib Nuh's death a keramat or shrine was built over the grave, which became a place of Muslim pilgrimage and attracted Haj visitors from afar afield as the Dutch East Indies and China on their way to Mecca.

Administration 
Habib Nuh's family (from his only son, Syed Ahmad) at first administered the makam through a trust fund known as Habib Nuh Trust Fund, with responsibility for the tomb's upkeep later transferred to the Muslims And Hindus Endowment Board in 1936, and finally in 1968 to the Majlis Ugama Islam Singapura.

In providing Muslim office workers a convenient location for prayers, the institution continues to play a major role in the community. In addition to the upkeep of visitors to the mausoleum, it also receives high-profile scholars for lectures and Khutbah and other religious services.

Transportation
The mosque is accessible from Tanjong Pagar MRT station.

See also 
 List of mosques in Singapore
 Islam in Singapore

References 

1890 establishments in Singapore
Mosques completed in 1903
Mosques in Singapore
Mausoleums in Singapore
Dargahs
19th-century architecture in Singapore
20th-century architecture in Singapore